Bloody Monday can mean:
Bloody Monday, the 1855 riots in Louisville, Kentucky
Bloody Monday (Louisiana), a 1929 incident during the impeachment of Governor Huey Long
Hilo Massacre, the 1938 police shootings of strikers in Hilo, Hawaii
Częstochowa massacre, the massacre of Polish and Jewish civilians by the Wehrmacht in 1939
Katowice massacre, the massacre of Polish defenders of Katowice by the Wehrmacht in 1939
Bloody Monday (Danville), a civil protest at Danville, Virginia, 10 June 1963
Claudy bombing, on 31 July 1972, when three car bombs exploded mid-morning on the Main Street of Claudy in County Londonderry, Northern Ireland
Abdi House raid, a 1993 attack by UN and US forces on a gathering of Somali elders

Other uses
Bloody Monday (manga), a manga series

See also
 Black Monday
 Bloody Sunday (disambiguation)